Heyneke Meyer (born 6 October 1967) is a professional rugby union coach, best known for coaching the Springboks from 2012 until 2015. Prior to coaching the Springboks, he spent many years at the domestic level in South Africa before coaching Leicester Tigers in England. Following his stint with the Boks, he also coached Stade Français. On 8 July 2021 he was announced as the new Director of Rugby for the Houston Sabercats of MLR.

Early years
Meyer attended Bergvlam High School in Nelspruit before studying sports psychology at the University of Pretoria. He obtained various degrees after high school life, including BA (Psychology, Geography and Human Movement Science), Hons BA (Geography).

Career

Club
Meyer, who studied at University of Pretoria, played for the university's rugby team, the Tukkies. He took on a player-coaching role with the team, and upon graduating in 1988, he took on a full-time role with the team. He coached various High School and Under-21 teams in Pretoria, before joining the SWD Eagles in the Currie Cup in 1997. He first started as an assistant coach with the team under Phil Pretorius, before being given the reigns of head coach in 1998. In his debut year, he led the team to the semi-finals during the 1998 Vodacom Cup, losing to the Golden Lions 31–19. He also improved their positioning in the Currie Cup, finishing seventh after the regular season. In 1999, the Eagles failed to make the semi-finals in the Vodacom Cup, though made the semi-finals of the Currie cup, defeating South African powerhouses  and Western Province along the way. In addition to this, Meyer was an assistant coach to Alan Solomons at the Stormers during the 1999 Super 12 season, in which the Stormers finished second on the table after the regular season, before being beaten 33–18 in the semi-final by the Otago Highlanders. Haven been appointed head coach of the Bulls for the 2000 Super 12 season, taking over from Eugene van Wyk, Meyer stood down from his post with the Eagles.

While at the Bulls, the side finish second to last, with only 1 win to their name, and at the Blue Bulls, acting as Assistant coach due to his Springboks commitments, 2000 was the worst season ever for the team, having failed to qualify for the top eight of the Currie Cup. In 2001, he replaced Eugene van Wyk, at the Blue Bulls, while also being dismissed from his post with the Bulls in the Super 12 due to poor results in 2000. He led the Blue Bulls to their first Vodacom Cup title, beating Boland Cavaliers 42–24 in the final. He didn't take part in the Blue Bulls Currie Cup campaign that year due to his Springboks commitments, though returned to Pretoria in 2002 as full-time coach with the Bulls at Super 12 and Currie Cup. The Bulls finished last during the 2002 Super 12 season with no wins, and like in 2000, with dismissed from his post. He remained with the Blue Bulls which he reach two consecutive Vodacom Cup semi-finals in 2003 and 2004, and claimed three consecutive Currie Cup titles in 2002, 2003 and 2004.

He returned to the Bulls in 2005 where the Bulls finished third after the regular season, only to lose to the New South Wales Waratahs 23–13 in the semi-final. In 2006 they reached the semi-final again but lost to the Crusaders 35–15. It wasn't until 2007 when the Bulls made it to the final, defeating South African rivals the Sharks 20–19 in Durban. Meyer's final actions in Pretoria was during the 2007 Currie Cup Premier Division, where after the regular season, the Blue Bull finished 4th, but lost to the Free State Cheetahs 11–6 in the semi-final.

On 30 June 2008, he was named head coach of Leicester Tigers in England. His stint in England was short, having won 9 matches with his new team, he took compassionate leave from his Tigers post to attend to family matters in South Africa, only to fully stand down from his post on 28 January 2009.

He later took up an executive role with the Blue Bulls in Pretoria.

International
Meyer made his first international appearance as a coach in 1999 when he coached the Emerging Springboks. He later became forwards coach for the Springboks ahead of the 1999 Rugby World Cup. South Africa finished top of their group, and made it to the semi-final after beating England 44–21. Though in the semi-final, South Africa lost to Australia after extra time, 27–21. He remained with the Springboks between his club commitments, until 2001, when he returned to Pretoria as a full-time coach with the Bulls and Blue Bulls.

Head coach of South Africa
In January 2012, Heyneke Meyer was named head coach of South Africa on a 4-year term until after the 2015 Rugby World Cup. His first match in charge was 1 of three tests against England during the South African tour. He won the first two tests 22–17 and 36–27 respectively, but drew the final test 14–all. He later led South Africa to third in the 2012 Rugby Championship, opening with a win at Newlands and a draw in Buenos Aires against newcomers.Argentina. South Africa pushed the Wallabies in Perth, but lost 26–19, before going down 21–11 to the All Blacks. Meyer gained revenge over Australia on 29 September, beating them 31–8 in Pretoria, though lost to New Zealand 32–16 in Johannesburg the following week. Their victory over Australia saw the Springboks climb to second if the IRB World Rankings for the first time since 2010. During the Springboks 2012 End-of-year tour, Meyer led South Africa to their first clean sweep since 2008, defeating Ireland 16–12, Scotland 21–10 and England 16–15.

In 2013, South Africa claimed 6 consecutive victories, which included a first ever victory over Australia at Suncorp Stadium in Brisbane. Then on 5 October, Meyer led South Africa into the 2013 Rugby Championship decider against the All Blacks, though ultimately lost 38–27. South Africa later went on to record another clean sweep on their End-of-year tour, their first back to back clean sweeps since their 1996 and 1997 End-of-year tour clean sweeps.

In 2014, having claimed a 2–0 test series victory over Wales, South Africa went on to beat the All Blacks for the first time since 2011, winning 27–25 at Ellis Park Stadium. Though because of their 24–23 loss to Australia in round 3, South Africa finished second for the second consecutive year. While on their 2014 end-of-year tour, South Africa lost 2 matches, Ireland 29–15 and Wales 12–6, the Welsh loss being their first since 1999.

In 2015, Meyer came under pressure having lost all 2015 Rugby Championship matches, including a first ever loss to Argentina 37–25, at home. He was called a "racist" in the media due to the lack of "black" players being selected, which even led to the team being taken to court, with their position at the 2015 Rugby World Cup under threat. Meyer got his first win in 2015, and in 4 matches, against Argentina in a Rugby World Cup warm-up match in Buenos Aires, winning 26–12.

In their first game of the 2015 Rugby World Cup, Meyer coached the Springboks in their first ever game against Japan, then ranked 13th in the World Rugby Rankings. The Brave Blossoms convincingly outplayed the Springboks, beating them 34–32 with a try in the corner, deep into injury time. Heyneke Meyer, often criticized for favouring "experience over talent", made a public apology to the South African nation for this loss, admitting that the team's performance was "unacceptable". Despite that opening loss, South Africa went on to finish third, winning all their remaining matches in their pool; Samoa 46–6, Scotland 34–16 and the United States 64–0, to secure top place in their pool. They beat Wales 23–19 in the quarter-finals, however lost to New Zealand 20–18 in the semi-final. They faced Argentina in the Bronze Final, securing a 24–13 victory to claim the bronze medal.

Meyer initially stated that he wished to remain as coach, but a number of provincial unions stated they would oppose handing Meyer a contract extension – with the team's style of play and lack of transformation being cited as reasons for this opposition – and Meyer subsequently resigned from his post as Springbok coach on 3 December 2015.

International matches as head coach
Note: World Rankings Column shows the World Ranking South Africa was placed at on the following Monday after each of their matches

Record by Country

Honours
Rugby World Cup / Webb Ellis Cup
Third: 2015
The Rugby Championship
Runners-up: 2013, 2014
Mandela Challenge Plate
Winners: 2013, 2014
Prince William Cup
Winners: 2013, June 2014
South African quadrangular tournament
Winners: 2013

Other honours
South Africa (as assistant coach)
Rugby World Cup / Webb Ellis Cup
Third: 1999

Bulls 
Super 14
Winners: 2007

Blue Bulls 
Currie Cup
Winners: 2002, 2003, 2004, 2006 (shared with Free State Cheetahs)
Runners-up: 2005
Vodacom Cup
Winners: 2001
Runners-up: 2003, 2004

References

External links
Tigers name Meyer as head coach
Tigers Coaching Team 2008/09

1967 births
Living people
South Africa national rugby union team coaches
People from Mbombela
South African rugby union coaches
White South African people
University of Pretoria alumni
Leicester Tigers coaches
Stade Français coaches